Moosehead is a rural community on the Eastern Shore of Nova Scotia, Canada, in the Halifax Regional Municipality.

The community is primarily located along the western shore of Necum Teuch Bay, an inlet of the Atlantic Ocean.

References

Communities in Halifax, Nova Scotia
General Service Areas in Nova Scotia